Stella Donnelly (born 10 April 1992) is a Welsh-Australian indie rock singer-songwriter and guitarist. After the success of her debut EP Thrush Metal in 2017, she signed with Secretly Canadian in 2018. She released her debut studio album Beware of the Dogs to critical acclaim in March 2019, peaking at number 15 on the ARIA Album Charts and winning Independent Album of the Year at the AIR Awards. Her second album, Flood, was released in August 2022, debuting at number 29 on the ARIA Charts.

Early life
Born in Western Australia to a Welsh mother, she spent some childhood years in Morriston before moving to Perth with her family.

Donnelly first started singing when she joined a rock band in high school (Irene McCormack Catholic College) that performed Green Day covers. After high school, Donnelly studied contemporary and jazz music at the Western Australian Academy of Performing Arts. Donnelly was a part of the bands Boat Show and Bell Rapids before leaving them to pursue her solo career.

Career

2017–2021: Beware of the Dogs

Donnelly released her first EP titled Thrush Metal in 2017 on the record label Healthy Tapes. In 2018, the EP was reissued in the United States by the American label Secretly Canadian.

Donnelly released her debut studio album, Beware of the Dogs, on 8 March 2019 via Secretly Canadian. It received widespread acclaim from critics, including Robert Christgau, who praised it as a "musical encyclopedia of [male] assholes".

At the ARIA Music Awards of 2019, Beware of the Dogs was nominated for Breakthrough Artist. In October 2019, Donnelly came at no. 6 in Happy Mags list of "The 15 Australian female artists changing the game right now".

2022–present: Flood 

In January 2022, Donnelly provided vocals for "Proof", a single from Methyl Ethel's fourth studio album Are You Haunted? She further featured on ReWiggled, a 2022 tribute album to Australian children's music group the Wiggles, covering their song "Ba Ba Da Bicycle Ride".

On 10 May, Donnelly premiered the song "Lungs" live on Triple J, and announced her forthcoming second studio album Flood. A music video for the song was also released, directed by herself and Duncan Wright. Two more singles – "Lungs" and "How Was Your Day?", were released to promote the album before it was released on 26 August 2022.

Following the release of the album, Donnelly will embark on an international tour around the United Kingdom, Europe and North America beginning in September.

Personal life
For recreation, Donnelly enjoys playing squash, swimming at beaches, birdwatching, gardening, completing cryptic crosswords, cooking, rock climbing with her partner, and playing board games with friends. In an interview with The Line of Best Fit she said, "My version of taking a break [from recording and touring] is filling up my day with as many activities as possible."

Donnelly describes Billy Bragg and Courtney Barnett as musical influences.

Political views and activism
Donnelly is a supporter of various social and political causes. Her 2017 debut single "Boys Will Be Boys", written about societal attitudes towards women and her friend's experience of sexual assault, was dubbed a "#MeToo anthem".

Donnelly is opposed to the celebration of Australia Day. In a 2019 interview with The Guardian she said, "It's a really nationalist, white pride day... and it's actually a very historic day for Indigenous Australians – an invasion day, and a day of mourning." Donnelly supports same-sex marriage, and was "relieved" when it was legalised in Australia in 2017. Donnelly is pro-choice.

Discography

Studio albums

EPs

Singles

Notes

Awards and nominations

AIR Awards 
The Australian Independent Record Awards (commonly known informally as AIR Awards) is an annual awards night to recognise, promote and celebrate the success of Australia's Independent Music sector.

APRA Awards 
The APRA Awards are presented annually from 1982 by the Australasian Performing Right Association (APRA), "honouring composers and songwriters".

J Awards 
The J Awards are an annual series of Australian music awards that were established by the Australian Broadcasting Corporation's youth-focused radio station Triple J. They commenced in 2005.

National Live Music Awards 
The National Live Music Awards (NLMAs) are a broad recognition of Australia's diverse live industry, celebrating the success of the Australian live scene. The awards commenced in 2016.

WAM Song of the Year 
The WAM Song of the Year was formed by the Western Australian Rock Music Industry Association Inc. (WARMIA) in 1985, with its main aim to develop and run annual awards recognising achievements within the music industry in Western Australia.

West Australian Music Industry Awards
The Western Australian Music Industry Awards (commonly known as WAMis) are annual awards presented to the local contemporary music industry, put on by the Western Australian Music Industry Association Inc (WAM).

Other awards

Nominated 

 Australian Women in Music Awards 2018 – Breakthrough Artist – Herself

References

External links 
 
 
 Stella Donnelly at Bandcamp
 

21st-century Welsh women singers
Singers from Cardiff
Musicians from Perth, Western Australia
Living people
1992 births
21st-century Australian women musicians
Secretly Canadian artists